The Batumi Ladies Open is a tournament for professional female tennis players. The event is classified as a $15,000 ITF Women's Circuit tournament. It has been held on outdoor hardcourts in Batumi, Georgia, since 1997 ($10k; later $15–75k).

Past finals

Singles

Doubles

References

External links
 Official website
 ITF search

ITF Women's World Tennis Tour
Hard court tennis tournaments
Tennis tournaments in Georgia (country)
Recurring sporting events established in 1997
Sport in Batumi